Doha Port is a census-designated port district in Doha, the capital city of Qatar.

Doha Port is centrally located in Doha, and is adjacent to some of the country's most popular tourist destinations such as Doha Corniche and Souq Waqif. Milaha Port Services gained control of the port in February 2011. Until the inauguration of Hamad Port in December 2016, Doha Port was the country's sole commercial port, capable of processing most types of cargo. Immediately after Hamad Port was commissioned in December 2016 near Al Wakrah, Doha Port suspended all commercial operations.

Development history
In 1971, a wharf with 2,407 feet of frontage capable of handling four ships at once was constructed at the behest of the government. The total cost was valued at £10 million and required a massive-scale dredging of approaches. This included an outer approach channel with a bottom depth of 27 feet and a bottom width of 350 feet running for 3.5 miles. A 1.5 mile-long inner approach channel, with a bottom depth of 30 feet and a bottom width of 400 feet, broadened into a maneuvering basin. The wharf was connected to the port through a 3,600 feet-long and 40-feet wide causeway. The government started work on another 757-long wharf valued at £250,000 in 1973.

Gallery

References

Communities in Doha